Elijah Webb Chastain (September 25, 1813 – April 9, 1874) was an American politician, soldier and lawyer.

Biography
Chastain was born near Pickens, South Carolina, in 1813. His family moved to Habersham, Georgia, in 1821. During the Seminole Wars, he served as a captain and a colonel. After receiving admission to the state bar in 1849, Chastain began practice in Blairsville, Georgia. In 1811, Chastain moved to Milledgeville, Georgia.

Elected to represent Georgia's 5th congressional district in the United States House of Representatives as a Unionist during the 32nd United States Congress, Chastain won reelection as a Democrat to an additional term in the 33rd Congress and served in Congress from March 4, 1851, to March 3, 1855.

Chastain was delegate to the Georgia secession convention in Milledgeville in 1861 which passed the Ordinance of Secession.  He served as lieutenant colonel in the Confederate States Army as part of the First Georgia Regiment during the American Civil War. During that time he was also Georgia's attorney for the Western and Atlantic Railroad in 1860 and 1861. Chastain died near Dalton, Georgia, on April 9, 1874, and was buried in his family cemetery near Morganton, Georgia.

See also
List of signers of the Georgia Ordinance of Secession

References
 Retrieved on 2008-10-12

Notes

1813 births
1874 deaths
Georgia (U.S. state) lawyers
American people of the Seminole Wars
Confederate States Army officers
People from Pickens, South Carolina
Georgia (U.S. state) Unionists
Signers of the Georgia Ordinance of Secession
Unionist Party members of the United States House of Representatives
Democratic Party members of the United States House of Representatives from Georgia (U.S. state)
People from Milledgeville, Georgia
People from Blairsville, Georgia
19th-century American politicians
19th-century American lawyers